Ketu North Municipal District, also known as Ketu-Dzigbe Municipal District, is one of the eighteen districts in Volta Region, Ghana. Originally it was formerly part of the then-larger Ketu District on 10 March 1989, which was created from the former Anlo District Council, until the northern part of the district was split off to create Ketu North District on 29 February 2008;  thus the remaining part has been renamed as Ketu South District. It was later elevated to municipal district assembly status on 15 March 2018 to become Ketu North Municipal District. The municipality is located in the southeast part of Volta Region and has Dzodze as its capital town.

Towns 
In addition to Dzodze, the capital and administrative centre, Ketu North Municipal District contains the following villages:

 Adrume
 Agowodome
 Afife 
 Dekpor-Horme
 Dekpor Yia
 Devego
 Ehie
 Ehihorme
 Kasu
 Kave
 Kporkuve
 Ohawu
 Penyi
 Tadzewu
 Weta
 Xife
 Atiteti
 Avalavi
 Klenormad

Sources 
 
 Ketu North at GhanaDistricts.com.

External links 
 Ketu North Municipal District Official Website

References 

Districts of Volta Region
States and territories established in 2008

it:Distretto di Ketu
nl:Ketu